Daniel Tarone (born 26 October 1975) is a Swiss footballer midfielder who is currently with FC Wohlen since leaving FC Aarau in the Swiss Super League.

Honours
FC Zürich
Swiss Cup: 2004–05

References

External links
 Statistics at T-Online.de 
 FC Aarau profile 
 
 football.ch profile 

1975 births
Living people
Swiss men's footballers
Switzerland under-21 international footballers
Swiss people of Italian descent
Swiss Super League players
FC Zürich players
FC Aarau players
AC Bellinzona players
SC Young Fellows Juventus players
FC Schaffhausen players
FC Wohlen players
Association football midfielders